The Rubeho warbler (Scepomycter rubehoensis) is a threatened species of bird in the family Cisticolidae. It is found in highland forests in the Rubeho–Ukaguru Mountains in Tanzania. This cryptic species was only described in 2009; it having traditionally been included in the closely related Winifred's warbler.

References
Bowie, R. C. K.; Fjeldså, J. & Kiure, J. 2009. "Multilocus molecular DNA variation in Winifred's Warbler Scepomycter winifredae suggests cryptic speciation and the existence of a threatened species in the Rubeho–Ukaguru Mountains of Tanzania." Ibis 151 (4): 709–719. 

Rubeho warbler
Endemic birds of Tanzania
Rubeho warbler